Iceland sent Heart 2 Heart with the song "Nei eða já" to the Eurovision Song Contest 1992 in Malmö, Sweden, after they won the Icelandic national final.

Before Eurovision

Söngvakeppni Sjónvarpsins 1992 
The Icelandic broadcaster, Ríkisútvarpið (RÚV), held a national final to select the Icelandic entry for the Eurovision Song Contest 1992 - Söngvakeppni Sjónvarpsins 1992. The contest was held at the RÚV TV studios in Reykjavík on 22 February 1992, hosted by Sigrún Waage. 9 songs competed, with the winner being decided through the votes of 8 regional juries and a professional jury. The winner was Sigríður Beinteinsdóttir and Sigrún Eva Ármannsdottir with the song "Nei eða já", composed by Friðrik Karlsson, Grétar Örvarsson and Stefán Hilmarsson. Sigríður had previously represented Iceland in 1990 as a member of Stjórnin with "Eitt lag enn".

At Eurovision
Sigríður and Sigrún performed for Iceland along with Grétar Örvarsson and Friðrik Karlsson as Heart 2 Heart. The group performed 11th on the night of the contest, following Malta and preceding Finland, and received 80 points for their performance of "Nei eða ja", placing 7th of 23 competing countries.

Voting

References

External links
Icelandic National Final 1992

1992
Countries in the Eurovision Song Contest 1992
Eurovision